TYM CORPORATION is a South Korean agricultural machinery manufacturing company headquartered in Seoul, South Korea with operations in more than 40 countries. The company began in 1951, founded in Busan, South Korea, as the Tong Yang Moolsan  and was renamed "TYM" in 2020.  TYM designs, produces, and sells tractors, combines, cultivators, rice transplanters and diesel engines.

History
In 1968 it merged with Korea Light Metal and commenced agricultural Machinery production. In 1973 Anyang Farm Machinery Factory established; company shares opened to the public. TYM's Research and Development Institute and Agricultural Machinery Training Institute were established in 1993.

TYM entered the US tractor market in 2004 and acquired Kukje (Branson) in 2016. Kukje Machinery and its Branson line would put TYM ahead of current number two LS Mtron among South Korean agricultural equipment players, and close to Daedong Co., the manufacturer of Kioti tractors and all-terrain utility vehicles.

Products

Tractors
Attachments
Cultivators
Rice transplanters
Combine harvesters
Engines

Brands
 Branson
 Kukje Machinery (KM)
 TYM

References

Tractor manufacturers of South Korea
South Korean brands
Manufacturing companies based in Seoul
Manufacturing companies established in 1951
South Korean companies established in 1951

Notes

External links
TYM History